Daniel Rowland may refer to:

 Daniel Rowland (preacher) (1711–1790), leader in the Welsh Calvinistic Methodist revival
 Daniel Rowland (runner) (born 1984), Zimbabwean long-distance trail runner
 Daniel Rowland (cricketer) (1826–1891), English cricketer
 Daniel Rowland (conductor), (born 1972), conductor and violinist